Alberta Provincial Highway No. 40, commonly referred to as Highway 40, is a south-north highway in western Alberta, Canada. It is also named Bighorn Highway and Kananaskis Trail in Kananaskis Country. Its segmented sections extend from Coleman in the Municipality of Crowsnest Pass northward to the City of Grande Prairie and is currently divided into four sections.

Route description 

The highway passes Kananaskis Village before terminating at the Trans-Canada Highway (Highway 1).

The third section is gravel and is part of the Forestry Trunk Road, which runs  from Highway 1A to Highway 579. The intention is that one day the entire road will be a continuous paved highway. In the past, other gravel sections were named Highway 940; the 900 series in Alberta is used for temporary names. There is no signed connection between the Kananaskis Trail section and the Forestry Trunk Road section; however, it is connected by using Highway 1, Highway 1X, and Highway 1A between Seebe and Ghost Lake.

The  section south of Cadomin is gravel while the remainder is paved. The highway shares  concurrency with the Yellowhead Highway (Highway 16), before continuing north and passing through the Town of Grande Cache en route to Grande Prairie.

Major intersections 
Starting from the south end of Highway 40:

Gallery

References 

040
Grande Prairie